Gela Bezhuashvili (born March 1, 1967) is a Georgian politician and served as the head of the Georgian Intelligence Service from February 1, 2008 to December 27, 2013. He formerly served as Minister of Defense from February 2004 to June 2004, Secretary of the National Security Council of Georgia from June 2004 to October 2005, and Minister of Foreign Affairs of Georgia from October 19, 2005 to January 31, 2008.

Education 
He was born in the townlet of Manglisi, Georgia, in 1967. In 1991, he graduated from the Ukrainian Institute of International Relations and International Law, Kiev State University, Faculty of International Law. In 1997 obtained Master of Law degree, LL.M-International and Comparative Law, Southern Methodist University (SMU) School of Law, Dallas, United States. In 2003 he entered the JFK School of Government, Harvard University as a mid-career student and is a Master of Public Administration (MPA) degree candidate.

Career 
Bezhuashvili started his career at the Georgian Foreign Ministry in the early 1990s, including being the Envoy Plenipotentiary and Extraordinary to Kazakhstan between 1993 and 1996. Throughout the 1990s, he was also actively involved in cooperation with the Council of Europe (CoE) and served as a chief negotiator at the accession of Georgia to the CoE in 1999. He then served as deputy Defense Minister from 2000 to 2004, and Defense Minister from February 2004 to June 2004, being the first civilian to be appointed to this post in post-Soviet Georgia. From June 2004 to October 2005, he was the Secretary of the National Security Council of Georgia, and replaced Salome Zourabichvili as Minister of Foreign Affairs on October 19, 2005.

In January 2008, he was replaced with David Bakradze as a foreign minister, and was reported to have decided to quit public life in favour of the private sector. On January 30, 2008, he was appointed a head of the Intelligence Department of Georgia, succeeding Anna Zhvania. Bezhuashvili continued to occupy the office under the new government of Bidzina Ivanishvili and his successor, Irakli Garibashvili, until December 27, 2013, when he was replaced with Davit Sujashvili.

Since 2000, along with his official duties, he was involved in scientific research on International Law issues. He is author of the book "International legal aspects of Georgian Foreign Policy," 2003 and a number of articles. He holds the diplomatic rank of Ambassador Extraordinary and Plenipotentiary and the civil service rank of State Chancellor.

Bezhuashvili is married and has two sons and one daughter . He speaks Georgian, English, Russian and French. His brother David is co-owner of the television stations Mze TV and Rustavi 2 as well as member of the Georgian parliament (United National Movement).

References

External links 

 http://www.gelabezhuashvili.ge
 Georgia Ministry of Foreign Affairs
 Georgian Intelligence Service

Diplomats of Georgia (country)
Government ministers of Georgia (country)
1967 births
Living people
Foreign Ministers of Georgia
Harvard Kennedy School alumni
Recipients of the Order of the Cross of Terra Mariana, 3rd Class
Expatriates from Georgia (country) in the United States
21st-century politicians from Georgia (country)